Vera Sisson (July 31, 1891 – August 6, 1954) was an American actress of the silent era.

Biography
Vera Sisson was born on July 31, 1891 in Salt Lake City. She received her education at Brownlee Collegiate School for Girls in Denver, Colorado. In 1912, Sisson applied for work as an extra at Universal Pictures and made her film debut in The Helping Hand (1913). Sisson received recognition as J. Warren Kerrigan's leading lady in seven successful films, including The Sandhill Lovers (1914), The Oyster Dredger (1915), and A Bogus Bandit (1915).

In 1915, Sisson was offered a contract with Biograph Studios, and the following year she married actor and director Richard Rosson. 

Sisson costarred with Harold Lockwood and Virginia Rappe in Paradise Garden (1917), Rudolph Valentino in The Married Virgin (1918), and Constance Talmadge in Experimental Marriage (1919). Her final film appearance was in Love 'Em and Leave 'Em (1926), starring Evelyn Brent and Louise Brooks. 

On May 1, 1939, Sisson and her husband Rosson, along with two other British nationals, were arrested on a charge of espionage in Vienna, Austria by the Gestapo, allegedly for filming military hardware. They were held in solitary confinement for 34 days and released.

On May 31, 1953, Richard Rosson committed suicide by carbon monoxide poisoning. A year later, on August 6, 1954, Sisson committed suicide by barbiturate overdose. She is buried at Hollywood Forever Cemetery near her brother in law Arthur Rosson.

Filmography

References

External links
 
 
 

1891 births
1954 suicides
American film actresses
American silent film actresses
Actresses from Salt Lake City
Barbiturates-related deaths
Burials at Hollywood Forever Cemetery
Drug-related suicides in California
20th-century American actresses
Female suicides